Heresy in Christianity denotes the formal denial or doubt of a core doctrine of the Christian faith as defined by one or more of the Christian churches.

The study of heresy requires an understanding of the development of orthodoxy and the role of creeds in the definition of orthodox beliefs, since heresy is always defined in relation to orthodoxy. Orthodoxy has been in the process of self-definition for centuries, defining itself in terms of its faith by clarifying beliefs in opposition to people or doctrines that are perceived as incorrect.

Etymology
The word heresy comes from haeresis, a Latin transliteration of the Greek word originally meaning choosing, choice, course of action, or in an extended sense a sect or school of thought, which by the first century came to denote warring factions and the party spirit. The word appears in the New Testament, usually translated as sect, and was appropriated by the Church to mean a sect or division that threatened the unity of Christians. Heresy eventually became regarded as a departure from orthodoxy, a sense in which heterodoxy was already in Christian use soon after the year 100.

Definition

Heresy is used today to denote the formal denial or doubt of a core doctrine of the Christian faith as defined by one or more of the Christian churches. It is distinguished from both apostasy and schism, apostasy being nearly always total abandonment of the Christian faith after it has been freely accepted, and schism being a formal and deliberate breach of Christian unity and an offense against charity without being based essentially on doctrine.

Early Christianity (1st century – c. 325 AD)

Development of Orthodoxy

The development of doctrine, the position of orthodoxy, and the relationship between the early Church and early heretical groups is a matter of academic debate. Walter Bauer, in his Orthodoxy and Heresy in Earliest Christianity (1934/1971), proposed that in earliest Christianity, orthodoxy and heresy did not stand in relation to one another as primary to secondary, but in many regions heresy was the original manifestation of Christianity. Bauer reassessed as a historian the overwhelmingly dominant view that for the period of Christian origins, ecclesiastical doctrine already represented what is primary, while heresies, on the other hand somehow are a deviation from the genuine (Bauer, "Introduction").

Scholars such as Pagels and Ehrman have built on Bauer's original thesis. Drawing upon distinctions between Jewish Christians, Gentile Christians, and other groups such as Gnostics and Marcionites, they argue that early Christianity was fragmented, and with contemporaneous competing orthodoxies. Ehrman's view is that while the specifics of Bauer's demonstration were later rejected, his intuitions are broadly accepted by scholars and were confirmed beyond what Bauer might have guessed.

According to H. E. W. Turner, responding to Bauer's thesis in 1954, "what became official orthodoxy was taught early on by the majority of church teachers, albeit not in fully developed form." According to Darrell Bock, a Christian apologist, Bauer's theory does not show an equality between the established church and outsiders including Simon Magus. According to Mitchell et al., each early Christian community was unique, but the tenets of the mainstream or catholic Church insured that each early Christian community did not remain isolated.

G. K. Chesterton, in his book Orthodoxy (1908), asserts that there have been substantial disagreements about faith from the time of the New Testament and Jesus, but that the Apostles all argued against changing the teachings of Christ, as did the earliest church fathers including Ignatius of Antioch, Irenaeus, Justin Martyr and Polycarp.

Diversity

The Ante-Nicene period (2nd-3rd century) saw the rise of a great number of Christian sects, cults and movements with strong unifying characteristics lacking in the apostolic period. They had different interpretations of Scripture, particularly the divinity of Jesus and the nature of the Trinity. Some of the major sects, cults and movements with different interpretations of Scripture from those of the Proto-Orthodox church were:
 Gnosticism (particularly Valentinianism) – reliance on revealed knowledge from an unknowable God, a distinct divinity from the Demiurge who created and oversees the material world.
 Marcionism – the God of Jesus was a different God from the God of the Old Testament.
 Montanism – relied on prophetic revelations from the Holy Spirit.
 Adoptionism – Jesus was not born the Son of God, but was adopted at his baptism, resurrection or ascension.
 Docetism – Jesus was pure spirit and his physical form an illusion.

Proto-orthodoxy

Before AD 313, the heretical nature of some beliefs was a matter of much debate within the churches, and there was no true mechanism in place to resolve the various differences of beliefs. Heresy was to be approached by the leader of the church according to Eusebius, author of the Church History.

Early attacks upon alleged heresies formed the matter of Tertullian's Prescription Against Heretics (in 44 chapters, written from Rome), and of Irenaeus' Against Heresies (ca 180, in five volumes), written in Lyon after his return from a visit to Rome. The letters of Ignatius of Antioch and Polycarp of Smyrna to various churches warned against false teachers, and the Epistle of Barnabas accepted by many Christians as part of Scripture in the 2nd century, warned about mixing Judaism with Christianity, as did other writers, leading to decisions reached in the first ecumenical council, which was convoked by the Emperor Constantine at Nicaea in 325, in response to further disruptive polemical controversy within the Christian community, in that case Arianist disputes over the nature of the Trinity.

Irenaeus ( – ) was the first to argue that his orthodox position was the same faith that Jesus gave to the apostles, and that the identity of the apostles, their successors, and the teachings of the same were all well-known public knowledge. This was therefore an early argument supported by apostolic succession. Irenaeus first established the doctrine of four gospels and no more, with the synoptic gospels interpreted in the light of John. Irenaeus' opponents, however, claimed to have received secret teachings from Jesus via other apostles which were not publicly known. Gnosticism is predicated on the existence of such hidden knowledge, but brief references to private teachings of Jesus have also survived in the canonic Scripture as did warning by the Christ that there would be false prophets or false teachers. Irenaeus' opponents also claimed that the wellsprings of divine inspiration were not dried up, which is the doctrine of continuing revelation.

Late Antiquity (313–476) and Early Middle Ages (476–799)

Christology

The earliest controversies in Late Antiquity were generally Christological in nature, concerning the interpretation of Jesus' (eternal) divinity and humanity. In the 4th century, Arius and Arianism held that Jesus, while not merely mortal, was not eternally divine and was, therefore, of lesser status than God the Father. Arianism was condemned at the Council of Nicea (325), but nevertheless dominated most of the church for the greater part of the 4th century, often with the aid of Roman emperors who favoured them. Trinitarianism held that God the Father, God the Son, and the Holy Spirit were all strictly one being with three hypostases. The Euchites, a 4th-century antinomian sect from Macedonia held that the Threefold God transformed himself into a single hypostasis in order to unite with the souls of the perfect. They were anti-clerical and rejected baptism and the sacraments, believing that the passions could be overcome and perfection achieved through prayer.

Many groups held dualistic beliefs, maintaining that reality was composed into two radically opposing parts: matter, usually seen as evil, and spirit, seen as good. Docetism held that Jesus' humanity was merely an illusion, thus denying the incarnation. Others held that both the material and spiritual worlds were created by God and were therefore both good, and that this was represented in the unified divine and human natures of Christ.

The orthodox teaching, as it developed in response to these interpretations, is that Christ was fully divine and at the same time fully human, and that the three persons of the Trinity are co-equal and co-eternal.

Legal suppression of heresies

It was only after the legalisation of Christianity, which began under Constantine I in AD 313 that the various beliefs of the proto-orthodox Church began to be made uniform and formulated as dogma, through the canons promulgated by the General Councils. The first known usage of the term 'heresy' in a civil legal context was in 380 by the "Edict of Thessalonica" of Theodosius I. Prior to the issuance of this edict, the Church had no state-sponsored support for any particular legal mechanism to counter what it perceived as 'heresy'. By this edict, in some senses, the line between the Christian Church's spiritual authority and the Roman State's jurisdiction was blurred. One of the outcomes of this blurring of Church and State was a sharing of State powers of legal enforcement between Church and State authorities, with the state enforcing what it determined to be orthodox teaching.

Within five years of the official criminalization of heresy by the emperor, the first Christian heretic, Priscillian, was executed in 385 by Roman officials. For some years after the Protestant Reformation, Protestant denominations were also known to execute those whom they considered heretics.

The edict of Theodosius II (435) provided severe punishments for those who had or spread writings of Nestorius. Those who possessed writings of Arius were sentenced to death.

Ecumenical councils

Seven councils considered by main Christian denominations as ecumenical were convened between 325 and 787. These were mostly concerned with Christological disputes:
The First Ecumenical Council was convoked by the Roman Emperor Constantine at Nicaea in 325 and presided over by the Patriarch Alexander of Alexandria, with over 300 bishops condemning the view of Arius that the Son is a created being inferior to the Father. Each phrase in the Nicene Creed, formulated at this Council of Nicaea (AD 325), addresses some aspect that had been under passionate discussion prior to Constantine I. Nevertheless, Arianism dominated most of the church for the greater part of the 4th century, often with the aid of Roman emperors who favoured them.
The Second Ecumenical Council was held at Constantinople in 381, presided over by the Patriarchs of Alexandria and Antioch, with 150 bishops, defining the nature of the Holy Spirit against those asserting His inequality with the other persons of the Trinity. This council also condemned Arianism.
The Third Ecumenical Council is that of Ephesus, a stronghold of Cyrillian Christianity, in 431. It was presided over by the Patriarch of Alexandria, with 250 bishops and was mired in controversy because of the absences of the Patriarchs of Constantinople and Antioch, the absence of the Syrian Clergy, and violence directed against Nestorius and his supporters. It affirmed that Mary is the "Bearer" of God (Theotokos), contrary to the teachings of Nestorius, and it anathematized Nestorius. A mirror Council held by Nestorius (Patriarch of Antioch) and the Syrian clergy affirmed Mary as Christokos, "Bearer" of Christ, and anathematized Cyril of Alexandria.
The Fourth Ecumenical Council is that of Chalcedon in 451, with the Patriarch of Constantinople presiding over 500 bishops. This council affirmed that Jesus has two natures, is truly God and truly man, distinct yet always in perfect union. This was based largely on Pope Leo the Great's Tome. Thus, it condemned Monophysitism and would be influential in refuting Monothelitism.
The Fifth Ecumenical Council is the second of Constantinople in 553, interpreting the decrees of Chalcedon and further explaining the relationship of the two natures of Jesus; it also condemned the teachings of Origen on the pre-existence of the soul, etc.
The Sixth Ecumenical Council is the third of Constantinople in 681; it declared that Christ has two wills of his two natures, human and divine, contrary to the teachings of the Monothelites.
The Seventh Ecumenical Council was called under the Empress Regent Irene of Athens in 787, known as the second of Nicaea. It supports the veneration of icons while forbidding their worship. It is often referred to as "The Triumph of Orthodoxy"

Not all of these Councils have been universally recognised as ecumenical.

In addition, the Catholic Church has convened numerous other councils which it deems as having the same authority, making a total of twenty-one Ecumenical Councils recognised by the Catholic Church.

The Assyrian Church of the East accepts only the first two, and Oriental Orthodoxy only three. Pope Sergius I rejected the Quinisext Council of 692 (see also Pentarchy). The Fourth Council of Constantinople of 869–870 and 879–880 is disputed by Catholicism and Eastern Orthodoxy.

Present-day nontrinitarians, such as Unitarians, Latter-day Saints and other Mormons, and Jehovah's Witnesses, reject all seven Councils.

Some Eastern Orthodox consider the following council to be ecumenical, although this is not universally agreed upon:
The Fifth Council of Constantinople was actually a series of councils held between 1341 and 1351. It affirmed the hesychastic theology of St. Gregory Palamas and condemned the philosopher Barlaam of Calabria.
In addition to these councils there have been a number of significant councils meant to further define the Eastern Orthodox position. They are the Synods of Constantinople in 1484, 1583, 1755, 1819, and 1872, the Synod of Iași, 1642, and the Pan-Orthodox Synod of Jerusalem, 1672.

Some individual examples of the execution of Eastern Orthodox heretics do exist, such as the execution of Avvakum in 1682.

High Middle Ages (800–1299) and Late Middle Ages and the early Renaissance (1300–1520) 

From the late 11th century onward, heresy once again came to be a concern for Catholic authorities, as reports became increasingly common. The reasons for this are still not fully understood, but the causes for this new period of heresy include popular response to the 11th-century clerical reform movement, greater lay familiarity with the Bible, exclusion of lay people from sacramental activity, and more rigorous definition and supervision of Catholic dogma. The question of how heresy should be suppressed was not resolved, and there was initially substantial clerical resistance to the use of physical force by secular authorities to correct spiritual deviance. As heresy was viewed with increasing concern by the papacy, however, the secular arm was used more frequently and freely during the 12th century and afterward.

Medieval heresies
There were many Christian sects, cults, movements and individuals throughout the Middle Ages whose teachings were deemed heretical by the established church, such as:
 Paulicians – an Armenian group (6th to 9th centuries) who sought a return to the purity of the church at the time of Paul the Apostle.
 Tondrakians - an Armenian group (9th to 11th centuries) who advocated the abolition of the Church along with all its traditional rites.
 Bogomils – a group arising in the 11th century in Bulgaria who sought a return to the spirituality of the early Christians and opposed established forms of government and church.
 Gundolfo – an itinerant 11th century preacher near Lille, France, who taught that salvation was achieved through a virtuous life of abandoning the world, restraining the appetites of the flesh, earning food by the labor of hands, doing no injury to anyone, and extending charity to everyone of their own faith.
 Cathars – a major Christian movement in the Languedoc region of southern France from the 11th to 13th centuries. The Cathars believed that human souls were the spirits of angels trapped within the physical creation of an evil god. Through living a pure and sinless life, the soul could become perfect and free from the snare of matter.
 Arnoldists – a 12th-century group, inspired by the example of controversial figure Arnold of Brescia (c. 1090 – June 1155), from Lombardy who criticized the wealth of the Catholic Church and preached against baptism and the Eucharist.
 Petrobrusians were 12th century followers of Peter of Bruys in southeastern France who rejected the authority of the Church Fathers and of the Catholic Church, opposing clerical celibacy, infant baptism, prayers for the dead and organ music.
 Henricans were 12th century followers of Henry of Lausanne in France. They rejected the doctrinal and disciplinary authority of the church, did not recognize any form of worship or liturgy and denied the sacraments.
 Waldensians – a movement that began in the 12th century in Lyon, France, and still exists today. They held that Apostolic poverty was the way to spiritual perfection and rejected what they perceived as the idolatry of the Catholic Church.
 Humiliati – a 12th-century group from northern Italy who embraced poverty, charity and mortification. Initially approved by the church, they were suppressed for disobedience in 1571.
 Brethren of the Free Spirit – a term applied in the 13th century to those, primarily in the Low Countries, Germany, France, Bohemia and northern Italy, who believed that the sacraments were unnecessary for salvation, that the soul could be perfected through imitating the life of Christ, and that the perfected soul was free of sin and beyond all ecclesiastical, moral and secular law.
 Apostolic Brethren (later known as Dulcinians) – a 13th to 14th century sect from northern Italy founded by Gerard Segarelli and continued by Fra Dolcino of Novara. The Apostolic Brethren rejected the worldliness of the church and sought a life of perfect sanctity, in complete poverty, with no fixed domicile, no care for the morrow, and no vows.
 Fraticelli (or Spiritual Franciscans) – Franciscan through the 13th to 15th centuries who regarded the wealth of the Church as scandalous.
 Neo-Adamites – a term applied in the 13th to 15th century to those, including Taborites, Picards and some Beghards, who wished to return to the purity of the life of Adam by living communally, practicing social and religious nudity, embracing free love and rejecting marriage and individual ownership of property.
Nicholas of Basel – a 14th-century Swiss leader who, after a spiritual experience, taught that he had the authority to use episcopal and priestly powers (even though he was not ordained), that submission to his direction was necessary for attaining spiritual perfection, and that his followers could not sin even though they committed crimes or disobeyed both the Church and pope.
 Lollards – the 14th century followers of John Wycliffe. They advocated translating the Bible into English, rejected baptism and confession, and denied the doctrine of transubstantiation.

Inquisition
At the beginning of the 13th century, the Catholic Church instituted the papal or monastic Inquisition, an official body charged with the suppression of heresy. This began as an extension and more rigorous enforcement of pre-existing episcopal powers (possessed, but little used, by bishops in the early Middle Ages) to inquire about and suppress heresy, but later became the domain of selected Dominicans and Franciscans under the direct power of the Pope. The use of torture to extract confessions was authorized by Innocent IV in 1252.

The Albigensian Crusade (1209–1229) was part of the Catholic Church's efforts to crush the Cathars. It is linked to the movement now known as the Medieval Inquisition. Another example of a medieval movement condemend as heretic is the Hussite movement in the Czech lands in the early 15th century.

The last person to be burned alive at the stake on orders from Rome was Giordano Bruno, executed in 1600 for a collection of heretical beliefs including Copernicanism, belief of an unlimited universe with innumerable inhabited worlds, opinions contrary to the Catholic faith about the Trinity, divinity of Christ, and Incarnation.

Reformation and Modern Era (1520–present) 
Martin Luther and Philip Melanchthon, who played an instrumental part in the formation of the Lutheran Churches condemned Johannes Agricola and his doctrine of antinomianism–the belief that Christians were free from the moral law contained in the Ten Commandments–as a heresy. Traditional Lutheranism, espoused by Luther himself, teaches that after justification, "the Law of God continued to guide people in how they were to live before God".

The 39 Articles of the Anglican Communion and the Articles of Religion of the Methodist Churches condemn Pelagianism.

John Wesley, the founder of the Methodist tradition, harshly criticized antinomianism, considering it the "worst of all heresies". He taught that Christian believers are bound to follow the moral law for their sanctification. Methodist Christians thus teach the necessity of following the moral law as contained in the Ten Commandments, citing Jesus' teaching, "If ye love me, keep my commandments" (cf. Saint John 14:15).

In the 17th century, Jansenism, which taught the doctrine of predestination, was regarded by the Catholic Church as a heresy; the Jesuits were particularly strong opponents of Jansenism. The text Augustinus, which propagated Jansenist beliefs, was repudiated by the Holy See.

In Testem benevolentiae nostrae, issued on 22 January 1899, Pope Leo XIII condemned as heresy, Americanism, "the rejection of external spiritual direction as no longer necessary, the extolling of natural over supernatural virtues, the preference of active over passive virtues, the rejection of religious vows as not compatible with Christian liberty, and the adoption of a new method of apologetics and approach to non-Catholics." Cardinal James Gibbons responded to Pope Leo XIII that no educated Catholic Christian in the United States subscribed to these condemned doctrines.

Last execution of a heretic
Then-Catholic priest Martin Luther made comments against burning heretics which were later summarized in the 1520 papal bull Exsurge Domine as "Haereticos comburi est contra voluntatem Spiritus" (It is contrary to the Spirit to burn heretics). When he failed to accept the bull and give a broad recantation of his writings, he was excommunicated in the subsequent 1521 papal bull Decet Romanum Pontificem.

The last case of an execution by the inquisition was that of the schoolmaster Cayetano Ripoll, accused of deism by the waning Spanish Inquisition and hanged on 26 July 1826 in Valencia after a two-year trial.

Modern Roman Catholic response to Protestantism

Some of the doctrines of Protestantism that the Catholic Church considers heretical are the belief that the Bible is the only supremely authoritative source and rule of faith and practice in Christianity (sola scriptura), that only by faith alone can anyone ever accept the grace of salvation and not by following God's commandments (sola fide), and that the only Christian priesthood can be a universal priesthood of all believers.

See also

 Catholic teachings on heresy
 History of Christianity
 Infallibility of the Church
 List of movements declared heretical by the Catholic Church
 List of people burned as heretics
 Pelagius
 Diversity in early Christian theology

Notes

References

Citations

Sources

Further reading
 
 
 
Latinovic, Vladimir (2020). Who Do You Call a Heretic? Fluid Notions of Orthodoxy and Heresy in Late Antiquity. Palgrave. .

 
Christian terminology